Ratchanon Phangkaew is a Thai professional footballer who plays for Thai League 2 side Udon Thani.

References

External links
Kon Division 2
Sport Guru SMM Online
Player Profile on SMM Online

Living people
Ratchanon Phangkaew
Ratchanon Phangkaew
Ratchanon Phangkaew
Association football defenders
1989 births
Ratchanon Phangkaew